Hainania serrata, also known as the Hainan minnow, is a cyprinid fish found in China and Vietnam.  It is the only member of the genus Hainania.

References

Cultrinae
Monotypic fish genera
Fish of Asia
Fish described in 1927